The 100-Series Highways are a series of arterial highways in the Canadian province of Nova Scotia.

A 100-series highway is a designation applied to a highway that can be a controlled-access expressway, Super-2, or fully divided freeway.  The designation can also be applied in some cases to sections of uncontrolled access roads which are deemed strategically important and which will be upgraded in the future to controlled-access.

These highways connect major population centres such as the Halifax Regional Municipality and Cape Breton Regional Municipality with smaller population centres such as Yarmouth, Truro, New Glasgow and Amherst, as well as the neighbouring province of New Brunswick.

Some of the 100-series highways also carry the Trans-Canada Highway designation on their routes.

The typical naming convention is to add 100 to a route containing a local trunk highway.  E.g. Trunk 3 is a local trunk highway and Highway 103 is the 100-series highway running parallel to Trunk 3 in this corridor.

A 100-series freeway is roughly equivalent in function to the 400-series highways of Ontario, Autoroutes of Quebec, or the Interstate Highway System of the United States, albeit on a much reduced scale and amount of traffic.  Many of these highways were developed during the 1960s–1990s as political projects and proved detrimental to rural railway service in the province, resulting in many rail line abandonments.

Route list 

Historical Note: Nova Scotia's original arterial highway number system had route number signs in the same shape as the U.S. Highway route number signs.  These signs are now used for trunk highways.

Nova Scotia is planning to convert many 100-series highways to divided 4-lane highways during the 21st century, pending availability of funding.

See also 
 List of Nova Scotia provincial highways
 400-series highways (Ontario)
 400-series highways (British Columbia)
 Autoroutes of Quebec

References 

100